The F-1 grenade is a hand grenade mass-produced by France during and after WW1, used en masse in the majority of European countries throughout the First and Second World Wars.

Overview 

The F-1 grenade was first put into mass production by the French State in 1915 during the First World War. In May 1915 the first of the F1 grenades (fusante No. 1) appeared in the French military, in limited quantities.  This new weapon inherited from the experience of the first months of the war: the shape was made to be more modern, with an external grooves pattern for better grip and easier fragmentation. The second expectation proved deceptive, since the explosion in practice gave no more than 10 fragments (although the pattern was designed to split into all the 38 drawn divisions). The design was proved to be very functional, especially due to its stability compared to other grenades of the same period. Later, the Fusante No. 1 was used en masse by many foreign armies in the period 1915–1940. The F-1 grenade has been used as a basis for the development of many other grenades by different nations, including the US and the Soviet Union.

The F-1 was very widespread during the first half of the 20th century, used by armies of France, United States, Imperial Russia, the Soviet Union, Finland, and others. Overall more than  sixty million of these grenades were produced over 25 years, from 1915 to 1940.

Development
Originally, the F1 was designed to use a lighter-based ignition system, but later it began using a percussion cap fuse. Designs such as the M1916 and M1917 Billant fuses turned the F1 into a time-fused grenade, which was the grenade's final ignition system. By World War II, the F1 used the M1935 fuse, which is a time-based fuse, but it differs from the M1916 Billant fuse internally. The F-1 in its original design was withdrawn from French military service in 1946. The altered models of the grenade remain in military service in countries around the world, among others in the Russian F1 Grenade and American Mk 2 grenade.

United States
The French F-1 grenade with the M1916 Billant fuse was the preferred grenade of the U.S. Army during World War I.

Russian Civil War
During the Russian Civil War, the F1 was both given to the White Movement forces by France and seized en masse by the Bolshevik regime, resulting in a very widespread use of the grenade. After the civil war, the Soviet artillery command decided to modify the French F-1 into the Russian F1 grenade design. In Soviet folklore and colloquial speech, the grenade became a national icon of social upheaval and revolution, although not referred to as the F-1 but rather as "limonka" ([lı'mɒnkə]), 'little lemon', due to its very wide usage during the civil war and the chaotic period of the early 1920s. The origins of the Russian limonka are ambiguous and remain a subject of historical debate, with one side presenting the case that the grenade was named after its shape and familiarity to the British No. 16 lemon grenade and another suggesting that the grenade was named after its French designer, Leman.

See also
 Kugelhandgranate
 Mills bomb

References

External links
Pictures of the various F1 fuses.
Rifle grenade that uses the F1 body.

Fragmentation grenades
World War II infantry weapons of France
World War I French infantry weapons
Hand grenades of France